Vistasvagge is a valley in the Kebnekaise massif, in the Kiruna Municipality. It extends northwest into Paittasjärvi at Nikkaluokta. The valley continues northwest towards Alesjaure. The Swedish Tourist Association built its first-ever lodge in the Kebnekaise area in this valley.

References 

Valleys of Sweden
Kebnekaise